Studio Berçot is a private training institute in fashion design, established in 1954, based in Paris and related to French fashion schools.

History 

Suzanne Berçot, painter and fashion illustrator, created the Cours Berçot in 1954 on the advice of her colleagues at the magazine Jardin des Modes. Drawing was a rigorous and necessary discipline in the heyday of Haute couture, both for designing and for representing the garment. After several years of close collaboration, in 1971, Madame Berçot entrusted the management of the Establishment to Marie Rucki, a former student who was active in the fashion world. She renamed it Studio Berçot. The decline of Haute Couture and the rise of ready-to-wear during the 1970s developed a large number of new professional activities in the field of fashion. Marie Rucki was highly aware of the constant changes in trends, and organized the curriculum to match the expansion of fashion design. Studio Berçot has become a key pool of talent dedicated to the designers/creators of the 1980s, to the artistic directors in large luxury houses of the 1990s, and to the fashion accessory market in the 2000s when mass retailing internationalized the industry.

Curriculum 
Reflecting the environment for which it prepares its students, Studio Berçot deliberately focuses its training on a three-year period to strengthen students' involvement in the work they have to produce.

Year 1 
By experimenting with the basics of artistic creation and a selection of techniques that are representative of the Fashion Industry, the first year tests students' capacity to position themselves. At the end of the year a jury of professors assesses students' aptitude to continue with the program.

Year 2 
Students are individually mentored in their own fashion project. Over time, with collections developed in close collaboration with teachers and external instructors, a personal dossier is developed which will constitute a future professional canvassing tool.

Fashion show 
The fashion show is considered to be the emblematic event in fashion, and therefore the definitive way of learning to carry a project through to the end. Consequently, a year-end fashion show can be organized, widely followed by the professional community.

Twinning 
Two students are selected each year to further their studies at the Academy of Arts University in San Francisco.

Year 3 
Depending on students' skills evaluations at the end of the first 2 years, internships are programmed within the Studio Berçot network. During this last year, students receive personalized mentoring and support by their teachers while entering the professional arena.

Subjects taught 
 Cultural: history of art and costumes, visits to museums and exhibitions, film screenings
 Research: nude drawing, fashion sketches, colors, trends
 Techniques: the study of volumes in clothes (cutting, sewing), prototyping (pattern design), embellishment of materials, pattern and textile design.

Studio Berçot does not uses a grading system, preferring a weekly assessment of each individual in a group, in the form of rigorous evaluations. The Studio Berçot certificate is recognized by the French government and is approved by the Rectorate of Paris.

Registration 
Applicants are seen individually with their personal dossier. The interview enables professors to examine future students' positioning and personality, to validate their registration. Considering the maturity required for the program, it is recommended that applicants hold a Baccalaureate degree (or foreign equivalent). All classes are taught in French, very good knowledge of oral French is essential.

Alumni with their own business 

Yacine Aouadi, Karine Arabian, Shinishiro Arakawa, Catherine Baba, Charlotte Balme (Yvonne Yvonne), Aymeric Bergada du Cadet, Alexandra Bernard, Camille Bidault-Waddington, Laurene Bouaziz (Tiger Sushi), Stella Cadente, Carlotta, William Carnimolla, Laurence Chauvin-Buthaud (Laurenceairline), Charlotte Chesnais, Caroline Christiansson, Thierry Colson, Marie Credou, Vincent Darré, Valérie Delafosse, Ligia Dias, Gordana Dimitijevic, James Dignan, Babeth Djian, Erotokritos, Yasmine Eslami, Nicole Farhi, Samuel François, Olivier Guillemin, Sosthen Hennekam, Sandie Jancovek, Dauphine de Jerphanion, Thierry Journo (Idly), Yoshiko Kajitani (Yoshiko Création), Konstantin Kakanias, Shirley Kurata, Lolita Lempicka, Véronique Leroy, Coralie Marabelle, Isabel Marant, Fred Marzo, Laurent Mercier (Lola), Lou Menais (Jour-Ne), Marion Meyer, Yasu Michino, Yvan Mispelaere, Benoit Missolin, Massimiliano Modesti, Roland Mouret, Jun Nakamoto, Robert Normand, Jun Okamoto, Shun Okubo, Catherine Ormen, Angela Papadopoulos-Fortune, Delphine-Charlotte Parmentier, Sébastien Peigne, Dorothée Perret, Chloé Perrin (Perrin), Antoine Platteau, Florian Pretet, Katja Rahlwes, Natacha Ramsay-Levi, Priscilla Royer (Pièce d'anarchive), François Sagat, Cédric Saint-André Perrin, Sherazed (Shera Kerienski), Shourouk, Vanessa Seward, Marie Seznec-Martinez, Sheila Single, Martine Sitbon, Sophie Theallet, Anne-Sophie Thomas, Alix Thomsen, Sylvia Toledano, Eri Utsugi (Frapbois), Nadège Vanhee-Cybulsky, Quentin Véron, Lucien Wang, Marie Welte (Maison Labiche), Yazbukey, Emmanuelle Youchnovsky, Gaspard Yurkievich

Professional Community 

A.P.C., Acné Studios, AD, Alaia, Alexandre Vauthier, Ami, Antidote, Antik Batik, Baby Dior, Balenciaga, Balmain, Bo De Bo, Bonpoint, Carven, Catherine Miran, Céline, Chanel, Chloé, Citizen K, Comme des Garçons, Courrèges, CR Fashion Book, Derek Lam, Diane von Fürstenberg, Dior, Double Magazine, Elle, Ères, Erik Halley, Erotokritos, Galeries Lafayette, Givenchy, Grazia, Guy Laroche, Haider Ackermann, Haut et Court, Hermès, Iceberg, Inès de La Fressange, Isabel Marant, J. Mendel, Jacadi, Jalouse, Jean Paul Gaultier (Gaultier Paris), John Galliano, Karla Otto, Kenzo, Kenzo Takada, Lalala Productions, Lancel, Lanvin, Laurence Dacade, Le Bon Marché, Le Printemps, Louis Vuitton, Lucien Pages, M6, Maje, Maison Hamon, Maison Margiela, Maison Michel, Maison Rabih Kayrouz, Malhia Kent, Marc Jacobs, Marie Claire, Mellow Yellow, Merci, Michelle Montagne, Michino, Milk, Montex, Moschino, Nelly Rodi, Nicholas Kirkwood, Nina Ricci, Numéro, Paco Rabanne, Paule Ka, Peclers Paris, PR Consulting, Princesse tam.tam, Public Image PR, Pucci, Quicksilver, Repossi, Rick Owens, Robert Clergerie, Roger Vivier, Saint Laurent Paris, Sergent Major, Sonia Rykiel, Sœur, Swarovski, The Row, Vanessa Seward, Undercover, Véronique Leroy, Vivienne Westwood, Vogue Hommes, Vogue Italia, Vogue Paris, WAD, Wooyoungmi, Wowo, Zac Posen, Zara

References

Quotes 
"Fashion is a form of expression." Marie Rucki"Today everything is going so fast that you have to reach the goal at the same time as the best of them". Marie Rucki"You don't need to come to the school. What I can teach you, you already know." Marie Rucki to Christian Lacroix

External links 
 Official website

Art schools in Paris
Fashion schools
French fashion